Bargala was a Byzantine fortified town constructed between the 4th and 6th century, a period spanning Late Antiquity and Early Byzantium. Today it is an archaeological site and a visitor attraction in the Karbinci Municipality, North Macedonia. It is located 20 km northeast of the modern city of Štip on the lower slopes of the Plačkovica mountain. Archaeological excavations have uncovered a basilica, trade quarters, a water tank, a bath, and a fortification system with an impressive main gate and infrastructure.

Gold coins of Emperor Phokas (602-610) are discovered at the locality, as well as 6th and 7th century Slavic pottery.

See also

Astibo
Estipeon

References 

Karbinci Municipality
Archaeological sites in North Macedonia
Former populated places in the Balkans
Geography of ancient Paeonia
Macedonia (Roman province)